La pagella  (Italian for "The report card") is a 1980 Italian sceneggiata film directed by Ninì Grassia. It is based on the 1977 sceneggiata 'A paggella. The film was a commercial success, grossing about one billion eight hundred million lire at the Italian box office.

Cast
 Mario Trevi: Salvatore Fontana
 Marc Porel: Police Commissioner Vincenzo Saliani
 Massimo Deda: Gennarino Fontana
 Rosalia Maggio: Pascarella
 Marisa Laurito: Assunta Fontana
 Marzio Honorato: Riccio
 Beniamino Maggio: Antonio

References

External links 
 

1980 films
1980 drama films
1980s Italian-language films
Italian drama films
1980s Italian films